This is a list of wars involving the Dominican Republic.

List

See also
 History of the Dominican Republic

References

 
Dominican Republic
Wars